Karimabad (also Romanized as Karīmābād) is a village in Kelarestaq-e Gharbi Rural District, in the Central District of Chalus County, Mazandaran Province, Iran. At the 2006 census, its population was 219, in 57 families.

References 

Populated places in Chalus County